The Croisière du Grand Hiver (French "Campaign of the Great Winter") was a French attempt to organise a winter naval campaign in the wake of the Glorious First of June.

Context
The Glorious First of June had ended on a strategic success for the French Navy, but on the tactical level, the fleet had suffered its greatest loss since the Battle of La Hogue.

At the end of the year, the National Convention ordered that a squadron under contre-amiral Jean François Renaudin, recently promoted for his defence of Vengeur du Peuple at the Glorious First of June, ferry ammunition from Brest to Toulon. This squadron comprised six ships of the line, three frigates and one corvette. Vice-amiral Villaret-Joyeuse was to sail the fleet of Brest out to escort Renaudin in the Bay of Biscay, cruise these waters for a fortnight, and then return to Brest while sending a 6-ship and 3-frigate strong squadron to Guadeloupe.

The fleet was in bad shape, with ships in disrepair and lacking food. After several attempts, the fleet departed on 24 December 1794.

Expedition 

During the manoeuvers for the departure of the fleet, the 110-gun Républicain broke her anchor cable and, at 17:30, before she could set sails, she touched Mingant rock. Before manoeuvers could be attempted, she began to sustain damage to her hull and take in water. Despite throwing her guns overboard she proved impossible to refloat and settled on the rock as water flooded into her hull. As her boats had been damaged or torn off it was impossible to evacuate, and with the heavy sea it was not until 9:00 the next day that Fougueux arrived on the scene and could send boats over to rescue the crew. Eventually, only 10 men drowned, while the rest were rescued.

The Redoutable also broke her cables, but managed to reach the open sea, followed by the frigate Vertu. In the afternoon of the 29th, the 35 ships of the fleet regrouped off Camaret-sur-Mer, and set sail the next day.

The heavy sea of 1 January damaged several of the ships. Nestor lost a mast and had to double back to Brest. The Téméraire sustained hull damage and started leaking.

The next day, as the weather improved, Vanstabel turned to the North-West with the light squadron, but after a few hours, a deep fog arrived and he lost contact with the fleet. The Neptune, which had been delayed upon departure by damage to her capstan, also lost the fleet and joined the light squadron on the 31st, along with three frigates and two corvettes. They would not rejoin the fleet until 24 January.

Three British frigates, HMS Diamond, HMS Flora and HMS Arethusa were dispatched on 2 January to investigate. HMS Diamond, her commander, captain William Sidney Smith, raised a French flag when challenged by the fleet, which allowed her to sail on. Later, she encountered a stranded ship, whose captain hailed HMS Diamond, during which the French captain stated his ship was the Nestor. Smith speaking perfect French, managed to talk with the French officers, and acquire significant insights of the French intentions. HMS Diamond sailed into Brest harbour on the 3rd to confirm this information.

Neptune had suffered considerably from the bad weather, to the point that her captain had warned Vanstabel. On Jan 25, another leak forced Neptune to tack as not to expose the affected section of her hull to water, and to send distress signals. For five days, most of the crew pumped water out of the ship and dropped the guns, ammunition and anchors overboard, until the 28th, at 12:30, when she reached  Perros-Guirec and ran aground. 50 men were found dead in the hull, while the rest of the crew evacuated the ship.

On Jan 28, a storm broke out, and caused further damage to several ships. The leakage on Téméraire had become so worrisome that she doubled back to Brest, but lost her way en route and finally arrived in Saint-Malo.

After a few days of cruise, the Neuf Thermidor had lost her stem, forcing captain Dorré to cut away the bowsprit and the upper foremast, and drop his anchors and upper battery overboard. By 29 January, pumps could not compensate for leakage. In the night, the ship rolled so much that the yards of the mainmast fell, destroying three pumps; from then on, the ship lowered in the water, and when the lower battery touched the waves, Majestueux and Marat sent boats over to evacuate the crew. Neuf Thermidor was deserted by 4:00 on the 31st, and she foundered around 7:00.

Superbe suffered the same fate. She had started to take in water on the 26th, and Captain Colomb had warned Villaret that his ship was sinking. Efforts to pump out water could not compensate for the leakage, even after throwing the artillery overboard, and on 30th, Villaret ordered the ship abandoned. Montagne, Montagnard and Papillon rescued the crew, but 21 men were lost.

The Scipion, an old ship that was scheduled for decommissioning, started slowly disintegrating soon after she left the harbour. By the 25th, her pumps could not keep ahead of the leakage, and Montagnard, Trente-et-un-Mai and Railleuse had been tasked to watch her. After an attempt to wrap her with cables failed, Captain Huguet requested and obtained permission to return to port, escorted by Trente-et-un-Mai. In the afternoon, the main topmast failed, breaking the main yard, which penetrated the deck vertically and broke two of the nine pumps; its leverage further contributed to the dismantling of the ship. At 16:00, Huguet requested assistance from Trente-et-un-Mai, which evacuated the crew in spite of a heavy sea. The ship was abandoned by 3:15 the next morning.

Convention lost her rudder and was towed back to Lorient by Pelletier.

On 3 February, the fleet regrouped in Brest. It had captured 70 merchantmen, as well as the 20-gun . It had lost three ships, and others had sustained severe damage.

The Renaudin squadron had to delay its mission to reach Toulon in order to support the rest of the fleet. Renaudin eventually departed for Toulon on 22 February with Jemmappes, Montagnard, Trente-et-un-Mai, Aquilon, Tyrannicide and Révolution, the frigates Courageuse, Embuscade, Félicité and the corvette Unité. They suffered from heavy seas and strong westerly winds. Trente-et-un-Mai lost her mizzen and her main topmast when she entered the Mediterranean, and had to be taken in tow by Tyrannicide. They nevertheless reached Toulon safely on 2 April.

Aftermath 
Overall, the campaign is considered as a naval disaster because of the heavy losses, sustained without the intervention of the Royal Navy, and especially since damaged ships could not easily be repaired with the endemic shortage of material in French arsenals. The French Navy effectively ceased to contest the British naval superiority from this point.

Another attempt at a winter cruise was made with the Expédition d'Irlande, in December 1796, and met with a similar disaster.

Sources and references

References

Bibliography 
 Batailles navales de la France, Onésime-Joachim Troude, Challamel ainé, 1867, vol.2, pp. 404–409
  pp.233 and following

External links
 Naval Database
 La guerre sur mer pendant la révolution et l'empire. Episode XV

Naval battles of the French Revolutionary Wars
Naval battles involving Great Britain
Naval battles involving France
Conflicts in 1794
Conflicts in 1795
1794 in France
1795 in France